Ameivula apipensis is a species of teiid lizard endemic to Argentina.

References

apipensis
Reptiles described in 2018
Lizards of South America
Reptiles of Argentina
Taxa named by Federico José Arias
Taxa named by Renato Recoder
Taxa named by Blanca Beatriz Álvarez
Taxa named by Eduardo Ethcepare
Taxa named by Matias Quipildor
Taxa named by Fernando Lobo
Taxa named by Miguel Trefaut Rodrigues